The 2017 Hungarian Ladies Open was a tennis tournament played on indoor hard courts. It was the 21st edition of the Hungarian Ladies Open, and an International-level tournament on the 2017 WTA Tour. The tournament was upgraded this year from its 2016 status as a $100,000 ITF Women's Circuit tournament.

Singles main draw entrants

Seeds 

 1 Rankings are as of 13 February 2017

Other entrants 
The following players received wildcards into the main draw:
  Dalma Gálfi
  İpek Soylu
  Fanny Stollár 

The following players received entry from the qualifying draw:
  Anna Blinkova 
  Anett Kontaveit
  Tamara Korpatsch
  Aliaksandra Sasnovich
  Isabella Shinikova 
  Barbora Štefková

Withdrawals 
Before the tournament
  Andrea Petkovic → replaced by  Irina Falconi

Doubles main draw entrants

Seeds 

1 Rankings are as of 13 February 2017

Other entrants 
The following pairs received wildcards into the doubles main draw:
  Anna Blinkova /  Panna Udvardy
  Ágnes Bukta /  Fanny Stollár

Withdrawals 
During the tournament
  Lucie Šafářová

Champions

Singles 

  Tímea Babos def.  Lucie Šafářová, 6–7(4–7), 6–4, 6–3

Doubles 

  Hsieh Su-wei /  Oksana Kalashnikova def.  Arina Rodionova /  Galina Voskoboeva, 6–3, 4–6, [10–4]

References

External links 
 

Hungarian Ladies Open
Hungarian Ladies Open
Lad
Buda